Toda Cura Para Todo Mal is a 2005 album by the Brazilian rock band Pato Fu. The album was produced by John Ulhoa. It was released in 2006 in DVD with videos of the whole music.

The studio 129 Japs is John's studio from his house. This album starred with a new integrity of the band, the keyboardist Lulu Camargo, ex-Karnak and used the producer that he took part.

Track listing
All songs written by John Ulhoa, except "Sorte e Azar" co-written by Ricardo Koctus.

 "Anormal" (Abnormal) – 3:26
 "Uh Uh Uh, La La La, Ié Ié!" (Ooh ooh ooh, la la la, Yeah Yeah!) – 3:15
 "Sorte e Azar" (Good Luck and Bad Luck) – 3:59
 "Amendoim" (Peanuts) – 3:29
 "Simplicidade" (Simplicity) – 3:23
 "Agridoce" (Bittersweet) – 3:44
 "No Aeroporto" (At the Airport) – 3:37
 "Estudar pra Quê?" (Why Study?) – 3:12
 "Vida Diet" (A Diet Life) – 3:58
 "O Que É Isso?" (What Is That?) – 3:33
 "!" – 2:51
 "Tudo" (Everything) – 3:08
 "Boa Noite Brasil" (Good Evening Brazil)  – 4:57

Personnel
Pato Fu
 Fernanda Takai -  lead  (all except 5, 8 and 11) and background vocals
 John Ulhoa - acoustic and electric guitars,  harmonica, keyboards, background vocals  (lead on "Simplicidade" and "Estudar pra Quê?"), songwriting, production, recording, mixing
 Ricardo Koctus - bass, background vocals, photography
 Xande Tamietti - drums, percussion
 Lulu Camargo - accordion, keyboards, piano

Additional personnel
 Manuela Azevedo - vocals on "Boa Noite Brasil"
 Carlos Freitas - mastering
 Daniela Conolly - art direction
 Denis & Jimmy Leroy - illustration, graphic project
 Sandro Mesquita - graphic coordinator
 Bruno Batista - A&R
 Aluízer Malab - executive producer
 Sara Eller, Vitor Takai - assistant executive producers

Special presentation

Manuela Azevedo (voice), the Portuguese band Clã, in "Boa Noite Brasil" (Good Evening Brazil).

DVD
Toda Cura Para Todo Mal is the third DVD released by Pato Fu.  It was released in 2007 and makes up a compilation with music videos from the album.
Making of from recordings
Information about the band

Curiosities

The song "Simplicidade" was sung by P. Pitch
A clip from "Uh Uh Uh, La La La, Ié Ié!" was created by a cartoonist Laerte.
"Agridoce" is a tribute to Roberto and Erasmo Carlos, the second in the proper voice and Fernanda with the flavor.
 The lyrics in "Boa Noite Brasil" related a viridity with the presentation in famous TV shows.
 "Amendoim" is based on a moment from Peanuts especially Charlie Brown, passed to the only son by a brother too old, which signifies the most responsibility with Sally Brown.

External links
 Toda Cura Para Todo Mal, by Pablo Moreno (Pílula Pop) 
 Toda Cura Para Todo Mal, by Poppy Corn 
 Toda Cura Para Todo Mal, by Abonico R. Smith (Bacana) 

2005 albums
Pato Fu albums